Johannes Kunze (June 6, 1892 – October 11, 1959) was a German politician of the Christian Democratic Union (CDU) and former member of the German Bundestag.

Life 
Kunze was a member of the German Bundestag from its first election in 1949 until his death. In 1949 he entered parliament via the state list of the CDU North Rhine-Westphalia, in 1953 and 1957 he won the direct mandate in the constituency of Iserlohn-Stadt und -Land.

From 1949 until his death he was chairman of the Bundestag committee for equalization of burdens. From 1953 to 1957 he was deputy chairman of the CDU parliamentary group.

Literature

References

1892 births
1959 deaths
Members of the Bundestag for North Rhine-Westphalia
Members of the Bundestag 1957–1961
Members of the Bundestag 1953–1957
Members of the Bundestag 1949–1953
Members of the Bundestag for the Christian Democratic Union of Germany
Members of the Landtag of North Rhine-Westphalia